The Prince's Countryside Fund is a charity founded in 2010 by King Charles III (then Prince of Wales).

The Fund is a limited company (company number 07240359) and registered charity (charity number 1136077 within England and Wales, 48055 within Scotland).  The fund provides approximately more than £1 million per year in grant funding and support for initiatives such as The Prince's Farm Resilience Programme to projects located within the United Kingdom. To date (2019), over 250 projects throughout the UK have received over £9 million in grant funding. Projects have ranged from support for farmer networks and cooperatives to funding for community run shops and pubs, transport schemes in isolated areas, and business skills support for enterprises in the countryside.

The Fund raises money through its corporate partnerships with various businesses such as Waitrose and Warburtons. This funding supports the Fund's grant schemes and other initiatives, including research into issues facing rural and farming communities. The Fund also provides emergency funding support in times of crisis to deal with problems such as flooding and animal disease. The Fund's Supporting Rural Communities Programme provides grants of up to £25,000 over two years.

The Fund's vision is of a confident, robust and sustainable agricultural and rural community which is universally appreciated for its vital contribution to the British way of life and fit to support future generations.

The charity has produced various research reports, including 'Recharging Rural' in 2018 which looked at the issues facing those living in rural areas and how they were overcoming them. This received wide spread attention on media such as the BBC and also diverse range of supporter from rural leaders to Sinn Féin. The Fund is publishing a follow up piece of work, the 'Village Survival Guide', during its annual awareness campaign National Countryside Week in July 2019.

The Director of the Fund is Keith Halstead. The organisation has twelve members on their board of Trustees, chaired by Lord Curry of Kirkharle. Other board members are: Elizabeth Faith Currer Buchanan, Edwin Booth, Mark Allen, Paul Murphy, Andrew Wright, Steve Mclean, Sara Bennison, Mark Duddridge, Alan Wilkinson, Rob Collins, and Lord Jamie Lindsay.

Sources

The Prince's Charities